Elections to Hackney London Borough Council took place on 3 May 2018. This was on the same day as other local elections.

The Labour Party retained overall control of the council, winning 52 out of 57 seats. The party gained three seats from the Liberal Democrats and lost one to the Conservative Party, for a net gain of two seats. The Green Party of England and Wales once again came second in the overall popular vote, but won no seats, falling short of a seat in Dalston ward by a margin of 21 votes.

Results summary

|}

Ward results
Asterisk denotes the sitting councillor.

Brownswood

Cazenove

Clissold

Dalston

De Beauvoir

Hackney Central

Hackney Downs

Hackney Wick

Haggerston

Homerton

Hoxton East & Shoreditch

Hoxton West

King's Park

Lea Bridge

London Fields

Shacklewell

Springfield

Stamford Hill West

Stoke Newington

Victoria

Woodberry Down

By-elections

Hoxton East and Shoreditch

King's Park

Stamford Hill West

Woodberry Down

References

Hackney
Council elections in the London Borough of Hackney